Sebastian Heindl (born 1997 in Gera, Germany) is a German organist.

Education
Heindl began studying piano at age five and then at age ten became a singer in the Thomanerchor of the St. Thomas Church in Leipzig, where he began studying the organ under the university organist, .

Career
Heindl has made recordings for MDR Fernsehen and Bayerischer Rundfunk public broadcasters and was featured in a BBC documentary with John Eliot Gardiner.

In 2017, he performed the Concerto pour orgue, cordes et timbales of Francis Poulenc with the Jungen Mitteldeutschen Kammerorchester in the Gewandhaus in Leipzig.

Selected awards
 2012 and 2015 - Jugend musiziert
 2016 - Internationaler Bach Wettbewerb Leipzig: Special Prize for the youngest participant
 2017 - : Organist of the Year 2016
 2017 - Northern Ireland International Organ Competition 2017, First Prize
 2018 - : Organ Competition, Third Prize
 2019 - Longwood Gardens International Organ Competition: Pierre S. du Pont First Prize, Audience Choice Prize, American Guild of Organists Philadelphia Chapter Prize

Selected discography 
 Flaschenpost-Geheimnisse: Dukas und seine Schüler, Alain, Messiaen und Duruflé.  Leipzig 2016.
 Sebastian Heindl: St. Matthias Berlin Concert (Dupré, Bach, Beethoven, Liszt, Franck, Duruflé, Middleschulte).  Spotify 2021.

References

External links 
 Official website
 Sebastian Heindl on YouTube
 
 Tanz mit dem Teufe (Dance with the Devil) Article in Die Zeit from March 3, 2021

1997 births
Living people
German male organists
21st-century organists
21st-century German male musicians